Jeffrey Scott Edell is an American entrepreneur in the entertainment, media, and tech industries. He currently serves as the CEO and Chairman of MeWe, a global social media and social networking service.

Jeffrey Edell is best known as serving as a top executive at numerous entertainment and technology organizations such as: CEO and president of Soundelux Entertainment Group, Chairman of Intermix Media (former parent company of MySpace) and eLabor.com (formerly jeTECH Data Systems) CEO of Inferno Pictures, CFO of Cinedigm, president and COO of DIC Entertainment, as well as former president and CFO of WTG Entertainment Enterprises. Edell is also co-founder of IndieU and Ohana Chem Co. LLC along with his daughter Natalie Edell. In early 2021, Edell was named CEO of MeWe.

Edell also serves as a contributing member of the Rolling Stone’s Culture Council, where he has written regularly on the future of the internet and social media.

Education
Edell attended Lehigh University to pursue a Pre-Medicine path and later transferred to the University of Virginia's McIntire School of Commerce, where he graduated with a B.S. in Commerce with an emphasis in Accounting and Taxation. He served as Associate Professor at Florida State University and was Entrepreneur in Residence for the Motion Pictures Arts College from 2014 to 2016. During his time at KPMG, Edell obtained his Certified Public Accountant certification.

Career
Edell is also known for overseeing and managing the development of brands such as Inspector Gadget and Strawberry Shortcake during his tenure at DIC Entertainment, as well as partnering with Stan Lee and POW! Entertainment on a game titled Stan Lee's Superhero Ball Wars. Edell was interviewed by journalist Julia Angwin in her 2009 book Stealing MySpace: The Battle to Control the Most Popular Website in America because of his role as Chairman of Intermix Media. Edell was also interviewed in 2022 by David Ryan Polgar on the All Tech Is Human podcast, which promotes the Responsible Tech field.

He was also featured in Start It, Sell It & Make a Mint: 20 Wealth-Creating Secrets for Business Owners by Joe John Duran. He also won the Master Award in Comic Collecting from the Certified Guaranty Company's Collectors Society, and served as goalie for the US Maccabi World Team at the Olympics in 2004. Edell is also Advisor, Chairman, and Co-Founder of Ohana Chem Co, LLC, a hemp extraction solvent supplier specializing in ethanol, hydrocarbons, and logistics.

As the CEO of the privacy-first social media platform MeWe, Edell has raised $27 million in a Series A round led by private company McCourt Global, which contributed $15 million. Previous investors contributed another $12 million—the round values MeWe at approximately $200 million. Axios also reported that under Edell's leadership, MeWe will migrate its platform over time to a Web3, blockchain-based web infrastructure, becoming the first major social network to migrate its tech over to a decentralized social networking protocol (DSNP).

Films and television
Edell serves as co-executive producer of the 2020 animated series the Fabulous Furry Freak Brothers based on the comic book series of the same name. The series was renewed for Season 2 to be released in December 2022. In May 2020, it was announced that the main characters in the series will be voiced by A-list celebrities including Woody Harrelson, John Goodman, Tiffany Haddish, and Pete Davidson. In 2021, Tubi announced that The Freak Brothers was the most-watched program on the platform. In addition, he was a producer and actor on the 2013 Lifetime movie Taken for Ransom (originally named Life Saver) with his wife Elaine Hastings Edell, a producer for various other films and an actor in National Lampoon's Movie Madness (formerly National Lampoon's Goes to the Movies). In addition, his companies have produced films such as The Kids Are All Right, Just Friends, Killer Elite, Hachi: A Dog's Tale, and The Grey.

His tenure at Soundelux garnered Edell recognition as Nasdaq and Ernst and Young's ‘Entertainment Entrepreneur of the Year' in 2000 and admission to both the Academy of Motion Picture Arts and Sciences, and the Academy of Television Arts and Sciences. He is also a member of the Producers Guild of America and the Young Presidents Organization, and a contributing member of the Rolling Stones Culture Council.

Edell's companies have won 5 Academy Awards, 50 Emmys, and 1 Grammy Award.

References

Year of birth missing (living people)
Living people
American chief executives in the media industry
University of Virginia alumni